Vincenzo Giustiniani (1590 – 13 February 1645) was a Roman Catholic prelate who served as Bishop of Brescia (1633–1645) and Bishop of Treviso (1623–1633).

Biography
Vincenzo Giustiniani was born in Venice, Italy in 1590. 
On 18 December 1623, he was appointed during the papacy of Pope Urban VIII as Bishop of Treviso.
On 7 January 1624, he was consecrated bishop by Pietro Valier, Bishop of Ceneda, with Agostino Gradenigo, Bishop of Feltre, and Pasquale Grassi, Bishop of Chioggia, serving as co-consecrators. On 31 January 1633, he was appointed during the papacy of Pope Urban VIII as Bishop of Brescia. 
He served as Bishop of Brescia until his death on 13 February 1645.

While bishop, he was the principal co-consecrator of Innocentius Serpa, Bishop of Pula (1624).

References

External links and additional sources
  (for Chronology of Bishops) 
  (for Chronology of Bishops) 
  (for Chronology of Bishops) 
  (for Chronology of Bishops) 

Bishops appointed by Pope Urban VIII
1590 births
1645 deaths
17th-century Roman Catholic bishops in the Republic of Venice